Teresa Alonso Leon (born 1975) is an American Democratic politician currently serving in the Oregon House of Representatives. She represents the 22nd district, which covers parts of Marion County along Interstate 5, from Woodburn down to northern Salem.

Biography
Alonso Leon was born in the Mexican state of Michoacán and moved to Gervais, Oregon at the age of 4. She graduated with a bachelor's degree from Western Oregon University in 2002, and with a master's degree in Public Administration from Portland State University in 2013. Alonso Leon, who became a United States citizen in 2012, was appointed to the Woodburn City Council in 2013.

In December 2015, Alonso Leon announced her candidacy for the House seat vacated by the retiring Betty Komp. She defeated Republican Patti Milne, a former state representative, in the general election with 55% of the vote. Alonso Leon became the first immigrant Latina elected to the Oregon legislature.

References

External links
 Campaign website
 Legislative website

1975 births
21st-century American politicians
21st-century American women politicians
American politicians of Mexican descent
Candidates in the 2022 United States House of Representatives elections
Hispanic and Latino American state legislators in Oregon
Hispanic and Latino American women in politics
Living people
Democratic Party members of the Oregon House of Representatives
Mexican emigrants to the United States
Oregon city council members
People from Gervais, Oregon
People from Woodburn, Oregon
Politicians from Michoacán
Portland State University alumni
Western Oregon University alumni
Women city councillors in Oregon
Women state legislators in Oregon